is a Japanese footballer currently playing as a goalkeeper for Albirex Niigata.

Career statistics

Club
.

Notes

References

External links

1997 births
Living people
Association football people from Niigata Prefecture
University of Tsukuba alumni
Japanese footballers
Japan youth international footballers
Association football goalkeepers
J2 League players
Albirex Niigata players